Níjar is a Spanish municipality in the province of Almería, Andalusia.  It lies in the eastern part of Almería, in the Sierra de Alhamilla and the south-eastern Mediterranean coast, in the Campo de Níjar, near the Cabo de Gata-Níjar Natural Park.

Níjar covers an area of 599.8 square kilometres, making it one of the most extended municipalities of Spain. Its population of 17,824 (2002) is mainly concentrated in the cities of Campohermoso, San Isidro, and Níjar.

The main sources of income are agriculture, especially in the growing of greenhouse crops, and tourism, especially the watersports centre of San José.

Demographics

References

External links
 
  Níjar - Diputación Provincial de Almería

Municipalities in the Province of Almería